The Rock is the tenth studio album by American country music artist Tracy Lawrence. His first album of Christian music, it was released on June 9, 2009, on his own Rocky Comfort label. Lead-off single "Up to Him" debuted at number 57 on the Hot Country Songs chart, and reached 47 shortly after the album's release.

Country Weekly gave the album 3.5 stars out of 5, saying that it "emphasizes at all turns the shared imperfections that we all strive to overcome in order to be good people".

Track listing
"Dear Lord" (Flip Anderson, Tracy Lawrence) – 3:18
"Every Prayer" (Michael Dulaney, Greg Johnson) – 3:02
"I'm Done" (Steve Seskin, Allen Shamblin) – 3:29
"The Book You Never Read" (Michael T. Post, Fred Wilhelm) – 3:57
"The Rock" (Jeff Batson, Aaron Scherz, Thom Shepherd) – 4:03
"Somebody Who Would Die for You" (Mark Narmore, Adam Wheeler) – 3:47
"Jesus Come Talk to Your Children" (Rick Huckaby, Paul Nelson) – 2:45
"I Know Where Heaven Is" (Dave Berg, Annie Tate, Sam Tate) – 3:37
"Up to Him" (Tim Johnson, David Kent) – 2:56
"Say a Prayer" (Jimmy Melton, Craig Morgan, Phil O'Donnell) – 3:22

Personnel
Gregg Stocki- drums
Joe Caverlee- fiddle, mandolin
Melodie Crittenden- background vocals
Wes Hightower- background vocals
Patrick Lassiter- bass guitar
Tracy Lawrence- lead vocals
B. James Lowry- acoustic guitar
Brent Mason- electric guitar
Kim Parent- background vocals
Steve Poole- keyboards

Chart performance
Album
The album debuted at number 20 on Billboard'''s Top Country Albums chart, becoming Lawrence's lowest-peaking studio album. It also became his second album to not chart in the Top 100 of the Billboard'' 200 charts.  While the album did not fare as well commercially as his other releases, it did garner Lawrence his first Grammy nomination, which was in the Best Southern, Country or Bluegrass Gospel Album category.

Singles

References

2009 albums
Tracy Lawrence albums
Albums produced by Julian King (recording engineer)